The 50th New Zealand Parliament was elected at the 2011 general election. It had 121 members (120 seats plus one overhang seat), and was in place from December 2011 until September 2014, followed by the 2014 general election. The first sitting of the 50th Parliament was held on 20 December 2011, where members were sworn in and Lockwood Smith was elected Speaker of the House. This was followed by the speech from the throne on 21 December. John Key continued to lead the Fifth National Government. Following the resignation of Smith, David Carter was elected Speaker.

The Parliament was elected using the mixed-member proportional representation (MMP) voting system. Members of Parliament (MPs) represent 70 geographical electorates: 16 in the South Island, 47 in the North Island and 7 Māori electorates. The remaining 51 members were elected from party lists using the Sainte-Laguë method to realise proportionality.

Electorate boundaries for 50th Parliament

The Representation Commission is tasked with reviewing electorate boundaries every five years following each New Zealand census.

The next census was scheduled for 8 March 2011, but it was postponed due to the disruption caused by the 22 February 2011 Christchurch earthquake. The Representation Commission undertook the review between October 2013 and April 2014 and changed the boundaries of 46 electorates, created two new electorates in the Auckland area, and abolished one electorate in Auckland. A total of twenty general and five Maori electorates remained unchanged.

2011 general election

The 2011 New Zealand general election was held on Saturday, 26 November 2011 and determined the membership of the 50th New Zealand Parliament.

One hundred and twenty-one MPs were elected to the New Zealand House of Representatives, 70 from single-member electorates, including one overhang seat, and 51 from party lists. A referendum on the voting system was held at the same time as the election, in which 57.8% of voters voted to keep the MMP voting system.

A total of 3,070,847 people were registered to vote in the election, with over 2.2 million votes cast and a turnout of 73.83%—the lowest turnout since 1887.

The preliminary results published on election night indicated that the incumbent National Party, led by John Key gained the plurality with 47.99% of the party vote and 60 seats, one seat short of holding a majority. The opposing Labour Party, led by Phil Goff, lost ground winning 27.13% of the vote and 34 seats, while the Green Party won 10.62% of the vote and 13 seats—the biggest share of the party vote for a minor party since 1996. New Zealand First, having won no seats in 2008 due to its failure to either reach the 5% threshold or win an electorate, made a comeback with 6.81% of the vote entitling them to eight seats.

National's confidence and supply partners in the 49th Parliament meanwhile suffered losses. Preliminary results indicated that ACT New Zealand won less than a third of the party vote it received in 2008, reducing from five seats to one.  The Māori Party was reduced from five seats to three, as the party vote split between the Māori Party and former Māori Party MP Hone Harawira's Mana Party. United Future lost party votes, but retained their one seat in Parliament.

The poor results for both the Labour Party and ACT resulted in changes to their leaderships. Labour leader Phil Goff and deputy Annette King announced on 29 November 2011 that they had tendered their resignations from the party leadership effective 13 December 2011, with both keeping their electorate representations.  ACT leader Don Brash failed to get re-elected to Parliament due to the poor party vote and resigned his party leadership on the night of the election.

On 10 December, the final results were published after the counting of the special votes. The main changes were that the National Party's vote share had decreased to 47.31%, resulting in 59 seats—one less than the 60 based on the preliminary results. The Green Party vote rose to 11.06%, which gained it one seat and is now eligible for 14 seats.  The redistribution of the seats means that the lowest-placed National member who qualified based on the preliminary results, Aaron Gilmore (a member of the 49th Parliament), was not returned again. The next person on the Green Party list, Mojo Mathers (a new MP), took the seat.

The Christchurch Central electorate, where the incumbent Brendon Burns (Labour) and Nicky Wagner (National) had received the same number of votes on election night, was won by Wagner with a majority of 45 votes, with Burns thus out of Parliament, as his list position is not high enough.  In the  electorate, Labour's Carmel Sepuloni achieved a majority of 11 votes as opposed to a 349-vote majority for National's Paula Bennett as indicated by the preliminary results.  Sepuloni would not have entered Parliament again without winning the electorate as her list placing was not high enough, meaning that she replaced the lowest-ranked Labour list candidate who qualified based on the preliminary results, Raymond Huo.  However, both electorates were subject to a judicial recount at the request of the Labour and National Parties, respectively, due to the tightness of each result. As a result of the recount, Nicky Wagner was confirmed as the winner of Christchurch Central with a majority 47 votes on 14 December, while in Waitakere, the recount swung the seat back to Paula Bennett with a majority of nine votes on 17 December.

On election night, 25 new MPs entered Parliament. With the changes in seats for National and the Green Party once the final count was released, this increased to 26 new MPs, with Mathers having joined the newcomers.  The final turnout of enrolled electors was 74.21%.

Members
The tables below show the members of the 50th Parliament based on preliminary counts of the 2011 general election.

Overview
The table below shows the number of MPs in each party following the 2014 election and at dissolution:

New Zealand National Party (59)
The National Party won 47.31% of the vote, entitling it to 59 seats. As it won 42 electorates, an additional 17 members were taken from the party list.

Nine new National Party members were elected, six from electorates and three from the party list. Fifty members from the 49th Parliament were returned.

New Zealand Labour Party (34)
The Labour Party won 27.48% of the vote, entitling it to 34 seats. As it won 22 electorates, an additional 12 members were taken from the party list.

Four new Labour Party members were elected, three from electorates and one from the list. Thirty members from the 49th Parliament were returned.

Green Party of Aotearoa New Zealand (14)
The Green Party won 11.06% of the vote, entitling it to 14 seats. As it did not win any electorate, all members were taken from the party list.

Seven new Green Party members were elected, with seven members from the 49th Parliament returning.

Mojo Mathers, elected as number 14 on the list, is New Zealand's first profoundly deaf MP.

New Zealand First (7)
New Zealand First won 6.59% of the vote, entitling it to eight seats. As it did not win any electorate, all members were taken from the party list. Six new members were elected, in addition to two former members.

The party was reduced to seven MPs when it expelled Brendan Horan in December 2012. Horan remained in Parliament as an independent MP.

Māori Party (3)
The Māori Party won 1.43% of the vote, which is short of the 5% threshold. The Māori Party won three electorates and will thus be represented by three electorate MPs. The 1.43% party vote share entitles the party to two seats and with three electorates won, an overhang was caused, increasing the size of the 50th Parliament to 121 seats.

Mana Party (1)
The Mana Party won 1.08% of the vote, which is short of the 5% threshold. Mana won one electorate and will thus be represented by one electorate MP. The 1.08% party vote share entitles the party to one seat.

United Future (1)
United Future won 0.60% of the vote, which is short of the 5% threshold. United Future won one electorate and will thus be represented by one electorate MP. The 0.61% party vote share entitles the party to one seat.

NZ Independent Coalition (1)

ACT New Zealand (0)
ACT New Zealand won 1.07% of the vote, which is short of the 5% threshold. ACT won one electorate and was thus represented by one electorate MP. The 1.07% party vote share entitled the party to one seat. Their sole MP resigned from Parliament on 13 June 2014.

Parliamentary business

The first sitting of the 50th Parliament was on 20 December 2011, with its main business the swearing in of new members and the election of the speaker. The State Opening was held on the following day by the Governor-General, Sir Jerry Mateparae.

By-elections during 50th Parliament
There were a number of changes during the term of the 50th Parliament.

Summary of changes during term
Lockwood Smith (National, List) resigned in January 2013 and replaced by Aaron Gilmore
Charles Chauvel (Labour, List) resigned in March 2013, and was replaced by Carol Beaumont
Parekura Horomia (Labour, Ikaroa-Rāwhiti) died on 29 April 2013. The resulting by-election on 29 June 2013 was won by Meka Whaitiri
Aaron Gilmore (National, List) resigned in May 2013 and was replaced by Claudette Hauiti
Jackie Blue (National, List) resigned in May 2013 and was replaced by Paul Foster-Bell
Lianne Dalziel (Labour, Christchurch East) resigned in September 2013 to contest the Christchurch mayoralty election. The resulting by-election on 30 November was won by Poto Williams
Katrina Shanks (National, List) resigned in December 2013 and was replaced by Jo Hayes
John Banks (ACT) resigned in June 2014. Due to the 2014 general election, no by-election was held.
Shane Jones (Labour, List) left Parliament in May 2014. He was replaced by Kelvin Davis.

Seating plan

Start of term 
The chamber is in a horseshoe-shape.

End of term 
The chamber is in a horseshoe-shape.

See also
Party lists in the 2011 New Zealand general election
Opinion polling for the 2011 New Zealand general election
Politics of New Zealand

References

2011 New Zealand general election
New Zealand parliaments